Hilley Gewog is a former gewog (village block) of Sarpang District, Bhutan.

References 

Former gewogs of Bhutan
Sarpang District